Merve Cansu Demır (born 6 September 2001) is a Turkish para table tennis player who competes at international table tennis competitions. She is a three-time European champion and double World bronze medalist. She competed at the 2020 Summer Paralympics where she competed in the singles and was defeated in the quarterfinals by Shiau Wen Tien in straight sets.

References

2001 births
Living people
Sportspeople from Ankara
Paralympic table tennis players of Turkey
Turkish female table tennis players
Table tennis players at the 2020 Summer Paralympics